Aruküla manor is a manor house in Aruküla, Raasiku Parish in northern-central Estonia.
Aruküla manor was created in the 17th century, the owner was then Karl Gustav von Baranoff.

See also
 List of palaces and manor houses in Estonia

References

External links
Aruküla manor at Estonian Manors Portal

Manor houses in Estonia
Buildings and structures in Harju County
Kreis Harrien